South Sudan requires its residents to register their motor vehicles and display vehicle registration plates.

Place image of south sudan license plate

References

South Sudan
Transport in South Sudan
South Sudan transport-related lists